The Río Grande River is a river in the U.S. commonwealth of Puerto Rico that flows through the El Yunque National Forest and the town of Río Grande.

See also

 Rivers in Puerto Rico

References

External links
 USGS Hydrologic Unit Map – Caribbean Region (1974)

Rivers of Puerto Rico
Río Grande, Puerto Rico